The Blues Brothers is a 1980 American musical comedy film directed by John Landis. It stars John Belushi as "Joliet" Jake Blues and Dan Aykroyd as his brother Elwood, characters developed from the recurring musical sketch "The Blues Brothers" on NBC variety series Saturday Night Live. The script is set in and around Chicago, Illinois, where it was filmed, and the screenplay was written by Aykroyd and Landis. It features musical numbers by rhythm and blues (R&B), soul, and blues singers James Brown, Cab Calloway (in his final feature film role), Aretha Franklin, Ray Charles, Chaka Khan, and John Lee Hooker. It features non-musical supporting performances by Carrie Fisher, Henry Gibson, Charles Napier, Kathleen Freeman and John Candy.

The story is a tale of redemption for paroled convict Jake and his blood brother Elwood, who set out on "a mission from God" to prevent foreclosure of the Roman Catholic orphanage in which they were raised. To do so, they must reunite their R&B band and organize a performance to earn the $5,000 needed to pay the orphanage's property tax bill. Along the way, they are targeted by a homicidal "mystery woman", Neo-Nazis, and a country and western band—all while being relentlessly pursued by the police.

Universal Studios, which had won the bidding war for the film, was hoping to take advantage of Belushi's popularity in the wake of Saturday Night Live, the film Animal House, and The Blues Brothers' musical success; it soon found itself unable to control production costs. The start of filming was delayed when Aykroyd, who was new to film screenwriting, took six months to deliver a long and unconventional script that Landis had to rewrite before production, which began without a final budget. On location in Chicago, Belushi's partying and drug use caused lengthy and costly delays that, along with the destructive car chases depicted onscreen, made the final film one of the most expensive comedies ever produced.

Due to concerns that the film would fail, its initial bookings were less than half of those similar films normally received. Released in the United States on June 20, 1980, it received mostly positive reviews from critics and grossed over $115 million in theaters worldwide before its release on home video, and has become a cult classic over the years. A sequel, Blues Brothers 2000, was released in 1998 to critical and commercial failure. In 2020, The Blues Brothers was selected for preservation in the United States National Film Registry by the Library of Congress as being "culturally, historically, or aesthetically significant."

Plot
Blues vocalist and petty criminal Jake Blues is released from prison after serving three years and is picked up by his brother Elwood in his Bluesmobile, a battered former police car. Elwood demonstrates its capabilities by jumping an open drawbridge. The brothers visit the Catholic orphanage where they were raised, and learn from Sister Mary Stigmata that it will be closed unless $5,000 in property taxes is collected. During a sermon by the Reverend Cleophus James at the Triple Rock Baptist Church, Jake has an epiphany: they can re-form their band, the Blues Brothers, which disbanded while Jake was in prison and raise the money to save the orphanage.

That night, state troopers attempt to arrest Elwood for driving with a suspended license due to 116 parking tickets and 56 moving violations. After a high-speed chase through the Dixie Square Mall, the brothers escape. The next morning, as the police arrive at the flophouse where Elwood lives, a mysterious woman detonates a bomb that demolishes the building, but leaves Jake and Elwood unharmed, and saves them from being arrested.

Jake and Elwood begin tracking down members of the band. Five of them are performing as "Murph and The MagicTones" at a deserted Holiday Inn lounge, and quickly agree to rejoin. Another turns them down as he is the maître d' at an expensive restaurant, but the brothers refuse to leave the restaurant until he relents. On their way to meet the final two band members, the brothers find the road through Jackson Park blocked by an American Nazi Party demonstration on a bridge; Elwood runs them off the bridge into the East Lagoon. The last two band members, who now run a soul food restaurant, rejoin the band against the advice of one's wife. The reunited group obtains instruments and equipment from Ray's Music Exchange in Calumet City, and Ray, "as usual", takes an IOU.

As Jake attempts to book a gig, the mystery woman blows up the phone booth he is using; once again, he is miraculously unhurt. The band stumbles onto a gig at Bob's Country Bunker, a honky-tonk in Kokomo, Indiana. They win over the rowdy crowd, but run up a bar tab higher than their pay, and infuriate the Good Ol' Boys, the country band that was booked for the gig.

Realizing that they need one big show to raise the necessary money, the brothers persuade their old agent to book the Palace Hotel Ballroom, north of Chicago. They mount a loudspeaker atop the Bluesmobile and drive around the Chicago area promoting the concert—and alerting the police, the neo-Nazis, and the Good Ol' Boys of their whereabouts. The ballroom is packed with blues fans, police officers, and the Good Ol' Boys. Jake and Elwood perform two songs, then sneak offstage, as the tax deadline is rapidly approaching. A record company executive offers them a $10,000 cash advance on a recording contract—more than enough to pay off the orphanage's taxes and Ray's IOU—and then shows the brothers how to slip out of the building unnoticed. As they make their escape via a service tunnel, they are confronted by the mystery woman: Jake's vengeful ex-fiancée. After her volley of M16 rifle bullets leaves them once again miraculously unharmed, Jake offers a series of ridiculous excuses that she declines, but when she looks into his eyes she takes interest in him again, allowing the brothers to escape to the Bluesmobile.

Jake and Elwood race back toward Chicago with dozens of state and local police and the Good Ol' Boys in pursuit. They eventually elude them all with a series of improbable maneuvers, including a miraculous gravity-defying escape from the neo-Nazis. At the Richard J. Daley Center, they rush inside the adjacent Chicago City Hall building, soon followed by hundreds of police, state troopers, and other public service formations. Finding the office of the Cook County Assessor, the brothers pay the tax bill. Just as their receipt is stamped, they are arrested by the mob of law officers. In prison, the band plays "Jailhouse Rock" for the inmates.

Cast

 John Belushi as "Joliet" Jake Blues, a former blues singer, paroled from prison after three years.
 Dan Aykroyd as Elwood J. Blues, Jake's blood brother, also a former blues singer.
 James Brown as the Reverend Cleophus James, pastor of the Triple Rock Baptist Church. His musical sermon "The Old Landmark" causes Jake to have an epiphany.
 Cab Calloway as Curtis, an old friend/father figure of the brothers, who suggests they visit the church, and helps them advertise the show and performs "Minnie the Moocher" for the audience.
 Ray Charles as Ray, a blind music store owner, who performs "Shake a Tail Feather" to demonstrate the effectiveness of the instruments he sells.
 Aretha Franklin as Mrs. Murphy, Matt Murphy's wife, who owns a soul food restaurant with him. She performs "Think" to persuade him not to join the band.
 Steve "The Colonel" Cropper – lead guitar; a member of Murph and the Magic Tones.
 Donald "Duck" Dunn – bass guitar; a member of Murph and the Magic Tones.
 Murphy Dunne ("Murph") – keyboards; lead singer of Murph and the Magic Tones.
 Willie "Too Big" Hall – drums; a member of Murph and the Magic Tones.
 Tom "Bones" Malone – trombone, saxophone; a member of Murph and the Magic Tones.
 "Blue Lou" Marini – saxophone; the dishwasher at the soul food restaurant.
 Matt "Guitar" Murphy – lead guitar; the cook at the soul food restaurant.
 "Mr. Fabulous" Alan Rubin – trumpet; the maitre d' at the Chez Paul restaurant.
 Carrie Fisher as the Mystery Woman, Jake's former fiancée, who tries to kill him for leaving her at the altar.
 Henry Gibson as the Head Nazi, the leader of a local American National Socialist White People's Party.
 John Candy as Burton Mercer, Jake's parole officer assisting the police in their hunt for the Blues Brothers.
 John Lee Hooker as Street Slim, a man singing "Boom Boom" together with a small band on Maxwell Street.
 Kathleen Freeman as Sister Mary Stigmata, AKA "The Penguin", the nun who leads the orphanage where the brothers grew up.
 Steve Lawrence as Maury Sline, the agent who organized and booked many of the Blues Brothers' performances before Jake was sent to jail.
 Twiggy as the Chic Lady, a woman who flirts with Elwood at the gas station.
 Frank Oz as a corrections officer, who returns Jake's  clothes to him at the beginning of the film.
 Jeff Morris as Bob, the owner of Bob's Country Bunker.
 Charles Napier as Tucker McElroy, lead singer and Winnebago driver of the Good Ole Boys.
 Steven Spielberg as the Cook County Assessor, who takes Jake and Elwood's money at the end of the film.
 Stephen Bishop as Charming Trooper
 Steven Williams as Trooper Mount, one of the cops who follows Jake and Elwood from the start.
 Armand Cerami as Trooper Daniel, Mount's partner and the other cop who follows Jake and Elwood from the start.
 John Landis as Trooper La Fong, a cop who chases the Bluesmobile at the mall, only to break his watch when his police car flips over.
 Joe Walsh as Prison Inmate
 Ben Piazza as Father, dining with his wife and three daughters at the Chez Paul and subject to abuse by Jake.
 Cindy Fisher as Daughter #2, one of the daughters who Jake leers at.
 Paul Reubens as Waiter, a colleague of Mr. Fabulous' at the Chez Paul.
 Rosie Shuster as Cocktail Waitress, who works at the Holiday Inn where Murph and the Magic Tones play.
 Chaka Khan as Choir Soloist, a member of the Triple Rock Baptist Church choir.
 Gary McLarty as Toys "R" Us Customer, who asks about buying a Miss Piggy toy right before the Bluesmobile begins smashing the mall.
 Layne Britton as The Cheese Whiz, a resident at the flophouse where Elwood lives.
 Pinetop Perkins as Luther Jackson, who argues with Street Slim over who wrote "Boom Boom."
 Carolyn Franklin as Soul Food Chorus #1, who sings along with "Think".
 De'voreaux White as Young Guitar Thief, who tries to steal from Ray's Music Exchange, only to nearly be shot by Ray.
 James Avery as Detective Avery (Uncredited)
 Lou Perryman as Man At Bar
 Luis Contreras as Bob's Country Bunker Patron #1 (Uncredited)
 Raven De La Croix as Woman In Concert Crowd
 Ralph Foody as Police Dispatcher, who comments on the Bluesmobile's arrival at Cook County and allows for using unnecessary violence in capturing Jake and Elwood.
 Leonard R. Garner Jr. as Lobby Guard #1

Production

Origins

The characters Jake and Elwood Blues were created by Belushi and Aykroyd in performances on Saturday Night Live. The name "The Blues Brothers" was the idea of Howard Shore. The fictional backstory and character sketches of blood brothers Jake and Elwood were developed by Aykroyd in collaboration with Ron Gwynne, who is credited as a story consultant for the film. As related in the liner notes of the band's debut album, Briefcase Full of Blues, the brothers grew up in an orphanage, learned the blues from a janitor named Curtis, and sealed their brotherhood by cutting their middle fingers with a steel string said to have come from the guitar of Elmore James.

Belushi had become a star in 1978 as a result of both the Blues Brothers' musical success and his role in National Lampoon's Animal House. At one point, he managed the triple feat of being the star of the week's top-grossing film and top-rated television series and singing on the No. 1 album within a year. When Aykroyd and Belushi decided they could make a Blues Brothers film, the bidding war was intense. Universal Studios narrowly beat Paramount Pictures for the project. John Landis, who had directed Belushi in Animal House, was aboard as director.

However, the project had neither a budget nor a script. On the former issue, Universal head Lew Wasserman thought the film could be made for $12 million; the filmmakers wanted $20 million. It would be impossible to settle on a specific amount without a screenplay to review, and after Mitch Glazer declined to help him, Aykroyd wrote one on his own.

Aykroyd had never written a screenplay before, as he admitted in the 1998 documentary Stories Behind the Making of The Blues Brothers, or even read one, and he was unable to find a writing partner. Consequently, he put together a very descriptive volume that explained the characters' origins and how the band members were recruited. His final draft was 324 pages, which was three times longer than a standard screenplay, written not in a standard screenplay format, but more like free verse. To soften the impact, Aykroyd made a joke of the thick script and had it bound with the cover of the Los Angeles Yellow Pages directory for when he turned it in to producer Robert K. Weiss. He titled it "The Return of the Blues Brothers", and credited it to "Scriptatron GL-9000". Landis was given the task of editing the script into a usable screenplay, which took him about two weeks.

The Blues Brothers held the record for the most cars destroyed in the course of production for 18 years, at 103, one fewer than were wrecked in its 1998 sequel Blues Brothers 2000. Both were surpassed by G.I. Joe: The Rise of Cobra (2009), with 112 cars destroyed.

Casting
At Aykroyd's demand, soul and R&B stars James Brown, Cab Calloway, Ray Charles and Aretha Franklin were cast in speaking parts to support musical numbers built around them. This later caused friction in the production between Landis and Universal, as its costs far exceeded the original budget. Since none of them except Charles had any hits in recent years, the studio wanted the director to replace them with—or add performances by—younger acts, such as Rose Royce, whose "Car Wash" had made them disco stars after its use in the 1976 film of that name.

Other musicians in the cast include Big Walter Horton, Pinetop Perkins, and John Lee Hooker (who performed "Boom Boom" during the Maxwell Street scene). The members of The Blues Brothers Band were themselves notable. Steve Cropper and Donald Dunn are architects of the Stax Records sound (Cropper's guitar can be heard at the start of the Sam & Dave song "Soul Man") and were half of Booker T. & the M.G.'s. Horn players Lou Marini, Tom Malone, and Alan Rubin had all played in Blood, Sweat & Tears and the house band on Saturday Night Live. Drummer Willie Hall had played in The Bar-Kays and backed Isaac Hayes. Matt Murphy is a veteran blues guitarist. As the band developed at Saturday Night Live, pianist Paul Shaffer was part of the act and thus cast in the film. However, due to contractual obligations with SNL, he was unable to participate, so actor-musician Murphy Dunne (whose father, George Dunne, was the Cook County Board President) was hired to take his role.

Fisher, Freeman, Gibson, and Candy were cast in non-musical supporting roles. The film is also notable for the number of cameo appearances by established celebrities and entertainment-industry figures, including Steve Lawrence as a booking agent, Twiggy as a "chic lady" in a Jaguar convertible whom Elwood propositions at a gas station, Steven Spielberg as the Cook County Assessor's clerk, Landis as a state trooper in the mall chase, Paul Reubens (before he became Pee-wee Herman) as a waiter in the restaurant Chez Paul, Joe Walsh in a cameo as the first prisoner to jump up on a table in the final scene, and Chaka Khan as the soloist in the Triple Rock choir. Muppet performer Frank Oz plays a corrections officer, and in the scene where the brothers crash into Toys "R" Us, the customer who asks for a Miss Piggy doll is played by stunt coordinator Gary McLarty. Singer/songwriter Stephen Bishop is an Illinois State Trooper who complains that Jake and Elwood broke his watch (a result of the car chase in the mall). Makeup artist Layne Britton is the old card player who asks Elwood, "Did you get me my Cheez Whiz, boy?" The character portrayed by Cab Calloway is named Curtis as a homage to Curtis Salgado, an Oregon blues musician who inspired Belushi while he was in that area filming Animal House.

Over 500 extras were used for the next-to-last scene, the blockade of the building at Daley Center, including 200 National Guardsmen, 100 state and city police officers, with 15 horses for the mounted police (and three each Sherman tanks, helicopters, and fire engines).

Filming
Principal photography began in July 1979, with the film's budget still not settled. For the first month, things ran smoothly on and off the set. When Weiss saw the supposedly final $17.5 million budget, he reportedly joked, "I think we've spent that much already."

In the next month, the production began falling behind schedule. Much of the delay was due to Belushi's partying and carousing. When not on the set, he went out to his familiar Chicago haunts such as Wrigley Field and the Old Town Ale House. People often recognized him and slipped him cocaine, a drug he was already using heavily on his own, hoping to use it with him. "Every blue-collar Joe wants his John Belushi story," said Smokey Wendell, who was eventually hired to keep it away from the star. As a result of his late nights and drug and alcohol use, Belushi would often miss unit calls (the beginning of a production day) or go to his trailer after them and sleep, wasting hours of production time. One night, Aykroyd found him crashing on the sofa of a nearby house, where Belushi had already helped himself to food in the refrigerator.

Cocaine was already so prevalent on the set (like many other film productions of that era) that Aykroyd, who used far less than his partner, claims a section of the budget was actually set aside for purchases of the drug during night shooting. The stars had a private bar, the Blues Club, built on the set, for themselves, crew, and friends. Carrie Fisher, who was Aykroyd's girlfriend at that time, said that most of the bar's staff doubled as dealers, procuring any drug patrons desired.

The movie's original budget was quickly surpassed, and back in Los Angeles, Wasserman grew increasingly frustrated. He was regularly confronting Ned Tanen, the executive in charge of production for Universal, over the costs. Sean Daniel, another studio executive, was not reassured when he came to Chicago and saw the production had set up a special facility for the 70 cars used in the chase sequences. Filming there, which was supposed to have concluded in the middle of September, continued into late October.

On the set, Belushi's drug use worsened. Fisher, who herself later struggled with cocaine addiction, said Landis told her to keep Belushi away from the drug. Wendell was hired to clear any drugs from the places Belushi visited off-camera. Nevertheless, at one point, Landis found Belushi with what he described as a "mountain" of cocaine on a table in his trailer, which led to a tearful confrontation in which Belushi admitted his addiction and feared it could eventually kill him.

After Aykroyd and Belushi's wife Judy had a talk with Belushi about his antics, the production returned to Los Angeles. Filming there again ran smoothly until it came time to shoot the final sequence at the Hollywood Palladium. Just beforehand, Belushi fell off a borrowed skateboard and seriously injured his knee, making it unlikely he could go through with the scene, which required him to sing, dance, and do cartwheels. Wasserman persuaded the city's top orthopedic surgeon to postpone his weekend plans long enough to stop by and sufficiently anesthetize Belushi's knee, and the scene was filmed as intended.

Locations
Much of The Blues Brothers was shot on location in and around Chicago between July and October 1979, including Joliet Correctional Center in nearby Joliet, Illinois, and Wauconda, Illinois, where the car crashes into the side of Route 12. Made with the cooperation of Mayor Jane M. Byrne, it is credited for putting Chicago on the map as a venue for filmmaking.  In an article written to mark the film's 25th Anniversary DVD release, Aykroyd told the Chicago Sun-Times: "Chicago is one of the stars of the movie. We wrote it as a tribute."

The first traffic stop was in Park Ridge, Illinois. The shopping mall car chase was filmed in the real, albeit shuttered, Dixie Square Mall, in Harvey, Illinois. The bridge jump was filmed on an actual drawbridge, the 95th Street bridge over the Calumet River, on the southeast side of Chicago. The main entrance to Wrigley Field (and its sign reading "Save lives. Drive safely, prevent fires") makes a brief appearance when the "Illinois Nazis" visit it after Elwood falsely registers the ballpark's location, 1060 West Addison, as his home address on his driver's license. (Elwood's Illinois driver's license number is an almost-valid encoded number, with Aykroyd's own birth date embedded.) Jake's final confrontation with his girlfriend was filmed in a replica of a section of the abandoned Chicago freight tunnel system. The other chase scenes included lower Wacker Drive, Lake Street, and Richard J. Daley Center.

In the final car chase scene, the production actually dropped a Ford Pinto, representing that which was driven by the "Illinois Nazis", from a helicopter at an altitude of about 1,200 feet—and had to gain a Special Airworthiness Certificate from the Federal Aviation Administration to do it. The FAA was concerned that the car could prove too aerodynamic in a high-altitude drop, and pose a threat to nearby buildings. The shot leading up to the car drop, where the "Illinois Nazis" drive off a freeway ramp, was shot in Milwaukee, Wisconsin, near the Hoan Bridge on Interstate 794. The Lake Freeway (North) was a planned but not completed six-lane freeway, and I-794 contained an unfinished ramp off which the Nazis drove. Several Milwaukee skyscrapers are visible in the background as the Bluesmobile flips over, notably the U.S. Bank Center.

The Palace Hotel Ballroom, where the band performs their climactic concert, was at the time of filming a country club, but later became the South Shore Cultural Center, named after the Chicago neighborhood where it is located. The interior concert scenes were filmed in the Hollywood Palladium.

The filming in downtown Chicago was conducted on Sundays during the summer of 1979, and much of downtown was cordoned off from the public. Costs for filming the largest scene in the city's history totaled $3.5 million. Permission was given after Belushi and Aykroyd offered to donate $50,000 to a charity after filming. Although the Bluesmobile was allowed to be driven through the Daley Center lobby, special breakaway panes were temporarily substituted for the normal glass in the building. The speeding car caused $7,650 in damage to 35 granite paver stones and a bronze air grille in the building. Interior shots of the elevator, staircase, and assessor's office were all recreated in a film set for filming.

Bluesmobile

The film used 13 different cars bought at auction from the California Highway Patrol to depict the retired 1974 Mount Prospect, Illinois, Dodge Monaco patrol car. The vehicles were outfitted by the studio to do particular driving chores: some were customized for speed and others for jumps, depending on the scene. For the large car chases, filmmakers purchased 60 police cars at $400 each, and most were destroyed at the completion of the filming. More than 40 stunt drivers were hired, and the crew kept a 24-hour body shop to repair cars.

For the scene when the Blues Brothers finally arrive at the Richard J. Daley Center, a mechanic took several months to rig the car to fall apart. At the time of its release, The Blues Brothers held the world record for the most cars destroyed in one film until it was surpassed by a single car in its 1998 sequel.

Post-production
Landis' difficulties continued even after principal photography was completed. The first cut of The Blues Brothers lasted two and a half hours, with an intermission. After one early screening, Wasserman demanded it be shortened, and 20 minutes were cut. The film's final budget was $27.5 million (equivalent to $ million in ), $10 million over its original budget.

Prospects for a successful release did not look good. Aykroyd and Belushi had left SNL at the end of the previous season, reducing their bankability. Belushi's fame had taken a further hit after the critical failure of Spielberg's film 1941 at the end of the year. One day after the editing was done, Wasserman invited Landis up to his office to speak with Ted Mann, head of the Mann Theatres chain, which dominated film exhibition in the Western United States. He told Landis that he would not book the film at any theaters in predominantly white neighborhoods, such as Westwood. Not only did Mann not want black patrons going there to see the film, but he also surmised that white viewers were unlikely to see a film featuring older black musical stars. Ultimately, the film got less than half the bookings nationwide for its initial release than a typical big-budget studio film of the era, which did not bode well for its success at the box office.

Reception

Box office
The Blues Brothers opened on June 20, 1980, with a release in 594 theaters. It took in $4,858,152, ranking second for that week (after The Empire Strikes Back). The film in total grossed $57,229,890 domestically and $58,000,000 in foreign box office for a total of $115,229,890. It ranked 10th at the domestic box office for the year. By genre, it is the ninth-highest-grossing musical and the 10th-highest earner among comedy road movies. It ranks second, between Wayne's World and Wayne's World 2, among films adapted from Saturday Night Live sketches. Director John Landis claimed The Blues Brothers was also the first American film to gross more money overseas than it did in the United States. Over the years, the film has retained a following through television and home video.

Critical reception
The Blues Brothers received mostly positive reviews from critics. On Rotten Tomatoes, the film has a 73% "Certified Fresh" rating, based on 90 reviews, with an average rating of 7.60/10. The site's critical consensus reads: "Too over the top for its own good, but ultimately rescued by the cast's charm, director John Landis' grace, and several soul-stirring musical numbers." It won the Golden Reel Award for Best Sound Editing and Sound Effects, is 14th on Total Film magazine's "List of the 50 Greatest Comedy Films of All Time," is 20th on Empires list of "The 50 Greatest Comedies", and is number 69 on Bravo's "100 Funniest Movies". Metacritic gave the film a score of 60 based on 12 reviews, indicating "mixed or average reviews".

Roger Ebert of the Chicago Sun-Times gave The Blues Brothers three out of four stars, praising it for its energetic musical numbers and "incredible" car chases. Ebert further noted that "Belushi and Aykroyd come over as hard-boiled city guys, total cynics with a world-view of sublime simplicity, and that all fits perfectly with the movie's other parts. There's even room, in the midst of the carnage and mayhem, for a surprising amount of grace, humor, and whimsy." Gene Siskel of the Chicago Tribune gave the film a "rare four-star rating", calling it "one of the all-time great comedies" and "the best movie ever made in Chicago". He described the film as "technically superb", praised it for "countering every explosion with a quiet moment," and said it "is at once a pure exercise in physical comedy as well as a marvelous tribute to the urban blues sound." He ranked it number eight on his list of the ten best movies of 1980. Richard Corliss, writing in Time, opined: "The Blues Brothers is a demolition symphony that works with the cold efficiency of a Moog synthesizer gone sadistic."

In his review for The Washington Post, Gary Arnold criticized Landis for engorging "the frail plot of The Blues Brothers with car chases and crack-ups, filmed with such avid, humorless starkness on the streets of Chicago that comic sensations are virtually obliterated." Janet Maslin of The New York Times criticized The Blues Brothers for shortchanging viewers on more details about Jake and Elwood's affinity for African-American culture. She also took director Landis to task for "distracting editing", mentioning the Soul Food diner scene in which the head of saxophonist Marini is out of shot as he dances on the counter. In the documentary, Stories Behind the Making of The Blues Brothers, Landis acknowledges the criticism while stating "Everybody has his opinion," and Marini recalls the dismay he felt at seeing the completed film.

Kim Newman, writing for Empire in 2013, considered The Blues Brothers to be "an amalgam of urban sleaze, automobile crunch and blackheart rhythm and blues" with "better music than any film had had for many years." He noted that Belushi and Aykroyd pack in their heroes: "Aretha storming through 'Think', Cab Calloway cruising through 'Minnie the Moocher', John Lee Hooker boogying through 'Boom Boom' and Ray Charles on electric piano." He observed that "the picture had revived the careers of virtually all the musicians that appeared in it" and concluded that "it still sounds great and looks as good as ever through Ray Bans."

On the 30th anniversary of the film's release, L'Osservatore Romano  (the daily newspaper of Vatican City State) wrote that the film is filled with positive symbolism and moral references that can be related to Catholicism. They went further, stating, The Blues Brothers "is a memorable film, and, judging by the facts, a Catholic one."

Cult-film status
The Blues Brothers has become a staple of late-night cinema, even slowly morphing into an audience-participation show in its regular screenings at the Valhalla Cinema, in Melbourne, Australia. John Landis acknowledged the support of the cinema and the fans by a phone call he made to the cinema at the 10th-anniversary screening, and later invited regular attendees to make cameo appearances in Blues Brothers 2000. The fans act as the members of the crowd during the performance of "Ghost Riders in the Sky".

In August 2005, a 25th-anniversary celebration for The Blues Brothers was held at Grauman's Chinese Theatre in Los Angeles. Attendees included Landis, former Universal Studios executive Thom Mount, film editor George Folsey, Jr., and cast members James Brown, Henry Gibson, Charles Napier, Steve Cropper, and Stephen Bishop. It featured a press conference, a panel discussion where Aykroyd joined by satellite, and a screening of the original theatrical version of the film. The panel discussion was broadcast direct to many other cinemas around the country.

The cult-like popularity of The Blues Brothers has also spread to non-English-language markets such as Japan; it was an inspiration for Japanese companies Studio Hibari and Aniplex, which led to the creation of the manga and anime franchise Nerima Daikon Brothers, which contain heavy references to the film.

American Film Institute
 AFI's 100 Years...100 Laughs – nominated
 AFI's 100 Years...100 Songs:
 "Think" – nominated
 AFI's 100 Years...100 Movie Quotes:
 "We're on a mission from God." – nominated

Release

Home media
When The Blues Brothers was first screened for a preview audience, a producer demanded that director Landis cut 25 minutes from the film. After trimming 15 minutes, it was released in theaters at 132 minutes. The film was first released on VHS and Betamax by MCA Videocassette Inc. in 1983; a Laserdisc from MCA Videodisc was released in the same year. It was then re-released on VHS, Laserdisc, and Betamax in 1985 from MCA Home Video, and again in 1990 from MCA/Universal Home Video. It was also released in a two-pack VHS box set with Animal House. The original length of The Blues Brothers was restored to 148 minutes for the "Collector's Edition" DVD and a Special Edition VHS and Laserdisc release in 1998. The DVD and Laserdisc versions included a 56-minute documentary, The Stories Behind the Making of The Blues Brothers. Produced and directed by JM Kenny (who also produced the "Collector's Edition" DVD of Animal House that same year), it included interviews with Landis, Aykroyd, members of The Blues Brothers Band, producer Robert K. Weiss, editor George Folsey Jr., and others involved with the film. It also included production photographs, the theatrical trailer, production notes, and cast and filmmaker bios. The 25th Anniversary DVD release in 2005 included both the theatrical cut and the extended version.

The Blues Brothers was released on Blu-ray on July 26, 2011, with the same basic contents as the 25th Anniversary DVD. In a March 2011 interview with Ain't it Cool News, Landis also mentioned he had approved the Blu-ray's remastered transfer. On May 19, 2020, the movie was given a 4K UHD release; it has a new 4K remaster from the original negative, and the extended footage was remastered from the same archived print as well.

SoundtrackThe Blues Brothers: Original Soundtrack Recording (later re-released as The Blues Brothers: Music from the Soundtrack''') is the second album by the Blues Brothers Band. Released on June 20, 1980, the album was a followup to their debut live album, Briefcase Full of Blues. The band toured the same year to promote the film, later releasing a second live album, Made in America, which featured the Top 40 track, "Who's Making Love".

The soundtrack was recorded in Chicago at Universal Recording Corporation at the same time the movie was being filmed, with the exception of "Gimme Some Lovin", which was recorded at the Record Plant in Los Angeles, and "The Old Landmark", which was recorded live on a Universal Studios sound stage on the West Coast, with overdubs later recorded at a studio in New York City.

The songs on the soundtrack album are a noticeably different audio mix than in the film, with a prominent baritone saxophone in the horn line (also heard in the film during "Shake a Tail Feather", though no baritone sax is present), and female backing vocals on "Everybody Needs Somebody to Love", though the band had no other backup singers, besides Jake and/or Elwood, in the film. A number of regular Blues Brothers' members, including saxophonist Tom Scott and drummer Steve Jordan, perform on the soundtrack album, but are not in the film.

According to Landis in the 1998 documentary The Stories Behind the Making of 'The Blues Brothers, filmed musical performances by Franklin and Brown took more effort, as neither artist was accustomed to lip-synching their performances on film. Franklin required several takes, and Brown simply rerecorded his performance live on a Universal Studios sound stage during filming of the holly roller church scene, with overdubs later recorded at a studio in New York City. Cab Calloway initially wanted to do a disco variation on his signature tune, "Minnie the Moocher", having done the song in several styles in the past, but Landis insisted that the song be done faithfully to the original big-band version.

"Gimme Some Lovin" was a Top 20 Billboard hit for the Blues Brothers, peaking at number 18.  The album sold more than a million copies.

Charts

Certifications

Other songs in the film
The film's score includes "God Music" (instrumental with choir vocalese) composed by Elmer Bernstein, who previously had worked with John Landis on National Lampoon's Animal House. Other songs in the film include:

Sequel

The 1998 sequel, Blues Brothers 2000, had similar traits to the original, including large car-chase scenes and musical numbers. Landis returned to direct the film and Aykroyd reprised his role, joining John Goodman, Joe Morton, and 10-year-old J. Evan Bonifant as the new Blues Brothers. Franklin and Brown were among the celebrities returning from the first film. There were also musical performances by Sam Moore, Wilson Pickett, Paul Shaffer, B.B. King, and Eric Clapton, among others. Dozens of artists were packed into an all-star band called The Louisiana Gator Boys. Even with many returning cast members, the film was considered a box-office failure, only generating a little over $14 million in sales, and critics' reactions were negative.

 Other works in the franchise 
In 1980, the book Blues Brothers: Private was published, designed to help flesh out the universe in which the film takes place. Private'' was written and designed by John Belushi's wife, Judith Jacklin, and Tino Insana, a friend of John's from their days at The Second City.

The video game The Blues Brothers was released in 1991.  It is a platform game in which the object is to evade police and other vigilantes to get to a blues concert.

In the 1990s, Film Roman was putting an animated series based on this film in the works, which was scheduled to be released in Fall 1997. The brothers of Dan Aykroyd and John Belushi (Peter and Jim) were set to take their roles as the titled characters. The series was ultimately canceled due to casting complications. John Belushi's memory was dedicated in the then-upcoming sequel as his character was killed off.

References

External links

 
 
 
 
 
 
 

The Blues Brothers
1980 films
1980s action comedy films
1980s adventure comedy films
1980s buddy comedy films
1980 comedy films
1980s chase films
1980s musical comedy films
American action comedy films
American adventure comedy films
American buddy comedy films
American chase films
American musical comedy films
Blues films
1980s English-language films
Fictional film duos
Films set in 1980
Films about brothers
Films about Catholic nuns
Films about musical groups
Films about orphans
Films directed by John Landis
Films set in Chicago
Films set in Illinois
Films shot in Chicago
Films shot in Illinois
Films shot in Wisconsin
Jukebox musical films
Films about neo-Nazis
Saturday Night Live films
Saturday Night Live in the 1980s
Films with screenplays by Dan Aykroyd
Films with screenplays by John Landis
Universal Pictures films
Films produced by George Folsey Jr.
United States National Film Registry films
Films produced by Robert K. Weiss
1980s American films